Bucculatrix stictopus is a moth in the family Bucculatricidae. It is found in Mexico. The species was described by Thomas de Grey, 6th Baron Walsingham in 1914.

References

Bucculatricidae
Moths described in 1914
Taxa named by Thomas de Grey, 6th Baron Walsingham
Moths of Central America